Louis Allen (30 October 1870 – 17 October 1932) was a New Zealand rugby union player. A centre and five-eighth, Allen represented Taranaki and, briefly,  at a provincial level. He was a member of the New Zealand national side between 1896 and 1901, appearing in 13 matches, but no test matches as New Zealand did not play its first full international until 1903. Lewis died in Nelson in 1932, and was buried at Wakapuaka Cemetery.

References

1870 births
1932 deaths
Rugby union players from New Plymouth
New Zealand rugby union players
New Zealand international rugby union players
Taranaki rugby union players
Manawatu rugby union players
Rugby union centres
Burials at Wakapuaka Cemetery